Mohammad Salim Israfeel Kohistani (born 5 June 1987) is an Afghan footballer who currently plays for Vejen Sports Forening. He is national team player of Afghanistan. He played in World Cup 2010 qualifiers, and 2014 FIFA World Cup Qualification. He is from north-eastern province of  Kapisa and is one of the most capped Afghan players ever along with Zohib Islam Amiri and Faisal Sakhizada.

When he was eight years old Kohistani picked up an unexploded grenade and lost four fingers on his left hand.

Club career
In 2000, he started playing football at the Habibia high school team, until 2003. In 2004, he played in first league at the Habibiana football team and soon after he made a transfer to the Army FC, where he played for 3 years. In 2007, he was transferred from Army FC to Kabul Bank FC. In these 3 years the club became vice-champion of national ligue and champion of all Afghanistan cups. His ability in the ground spirit of the game Inspired many I-League teams to transfer him. Kingfisher East Bengal F.C. have asked him to play for them, But Kohistani denied their request. After that he transferred to Denmark club Vejen Sports Forening.

International career

Kohistani has represented Afghanistan in almost every youth team. He became a member of the senior team in 2005. He played 3 times in SAFF Cup, 2 times in AFC Challenge Cup and 2 times in South Asian Games. He also represented the Afghanistan national football team in the FIFA World Cup 2010 qualifiers, where they were eliminated by Syria, in 2007. He recently scored one goal for Afghanistan in Tau Devi Lal Stadium which led Afghanistan 2–0 victory over Bhutan in 2012 AFC Challenge Cup qualification, the second goal was scored by Waheed Nadeem. He assisted one goal against Palestine in 2014 FIFA World Cup Qualification which was scored by Bilal Arzou.

Career statistics

Club

International

International goals
Scores and results list Afghanistan's goal tally first.

References

External links

Israfeel Kohistani Official Blog
Israfeel Kohistani at FIFA.Com

At Vejle FC

1987 births
Living people
Footballers from Kabul
Afghan footballers
Afghanistan international footballers
Association football midfielders